Undertow is a 1930 American drama film directed by Harry A. Pollard, written by Edward T. Lowe, Jr. and Winnifred Reeve, and starring Mary Nolan, Johnny Mack Brown, Robert Ellis, Churchill Ross and Audrey Ferris. It was released in March 1930, by Universal Pictures.

Cast 
Mary Nolan as Sally Blake
Johnny Mack Brown as Paul Whalen
Robert Ellis as Jim Paine
Churchill Ross as Lindy
Audrey Ferris as Kitty

References

External links 
 

1930 films
1930s English-language films
American drama films
1930 drama films
Universal Pictures films
Films directed by Harry A. Pollard
American black-and-white films
1930s American films